WSH  may refer to:
 Windows Script Host,  an automation technology for Microsoft Windows operating systems
 World Series Hockey, a hockey tournament initiated by Indian Hockey Federation in 2012
American Washington, DC sports teams: Washington Commanders, Washington Wizards, Washington Nationals, and Washington Capitals
 Western Steppe Herders
 Traverse City West Senior High School, a high school in Traverse City, Michigan